Piedra River may refer to:

Piedra River (Colorado), a tributary of the San Juan River
Piedra River, Spain, a tributary of the river Jalón